12B is a 2001 Tamil movie.

12B may also refer to:

New York State Route 12B, a state highway in the central part of New York
Missouri Route 12B
Nebraska Spur 12B
12B, a bus route in Chennai
WASP-12b, an extrasolar planet
HAT-P-12b, an extrasolar planet
 Boron-12 (12B), an isotope of boron
 12B, a short-lived Mazda Wankel engine
 12B United States MOS enlisted (military occupational specialty) for "Combat Engineer"

See also
B12 (disambiguation)